Alexey Ivanovich Sorokin (28 March 1922 – 4 March 2020) was a Soviet Fleet Admiral and member of the Congress of People's Deputies of the Soviet Union.

Sorokin was born one of five children. His father, a veteran invalid of the Russian Civil War, died in 1933 and his brother, Seraphim, was reported as missing in action at the front near Moscow in March 1942. Sorokin joined the Red Army in 1941 and served as a mortar operator. He was promoted to lieutenant, commanding a mortar battery and fought during the liberation of Belarus and with the Baltic Front.

After the war, Sorokin served as a political officer and studied at the Lenin Military-Political Academy between 1948 and 1952. After graduating Sorokin was posted to the Navy and served as a political officer on the destroyers Redkiy and Vdumchevy of the Soviet Pacific Fleet. In 1954 he became political officer aboard the cruiser Kalinin. In 1956 he became political officer of the Pacific Fleet destroyer squadron and in 1959 he became base political officer at Sovetskaya Gavan.

Sorokin became chief political officer of the Northern Fleet in 1974 and was promoted to vice admiral in 1975. He became chief political officer of the Soviet Navy in 1980 and deputy chief political officer of the Soviet armed forces in 1981. He was promoted to Fleet Admiral in 1988 and retired in 1992.

Sorokin served as a People's Deputy in the Congress of People's Deputies of the Soviet Union in 1989–91. In retirement he lived in Moscow and was president of the International Union of CIS War Veterans (Pensioners) Associations.

Sorokin died on 4 March 2020 at the age of 97. He was buried in the Federal Military Memorial Cemetery on 6 March.

Honours and awards
 Order of Lenin
 Order of October Revolution
 Order of the Patriotic War, 1st class, twice, and 2nd class
 Order of the Red Banner of Labour
 Order of the Red Star, twice
 Order for Service to the Homeland in the Armed Forces of the USSR, 3rd class
 Jubilee Medal "In Commemoration of the 100th Anniversary since the Birth of Vladimir Il'ich Lenin"
 Medal "For the Victory over Germany in the Great Patriotic War 1941–1945"

References

Page in Russian
Sorokin's personal web page in Russian

1922 births
2020 deaths
Russian military leaders
Soviet admirals
Soviet military personnel of World War II
Communist Party of the Soviet Union members
Recipients of the Order of Lenin
Lenin Military Political Academy alumni
Eleventh convocation members of the Supreme Soviet of the Soviet Union
Members of the Congress of People's Deputies of the Soviet Union
Burials at the Federal Military Memorial Cemetery